The 1966–67 Swiss Cup was the 42nd season of Switzerland's annual cup competition. The winner was FC Basel.

Overview

Principal rounds
The first principal round was held on September 10 and 11 and the second principal round was held on October 1 and 2. The teams from the Nationalliga A and Nationalliga B were granted byes.

Main rounds
The Nationalliga B teams joined the competition in the Round of 64 and the teams from the Nationalliga A in the round of 32.

The final was held in the former Wankdorf Stadium on 15 May 1967. The opponents were FC Basel and Lausanne-Sports. The game went down in football history due to the sit-down strike that followed a penalty goal shortly before the end of the match. After 88 minutes of play, with the score at 1–1, referee Karl Göppel awarded Basel a controversial penalty. André Grobéty had pushed Helmut Hauser gently in the back and he had let himself drop theatrically. Hauser scored the decisive penalty. Subsequent to the 2–1 lead for Basel the Lausanne players refused to resume the game and they sat down demonstratively on the pitch. The referee had to abandon the match. Basel were awarded the cup with a 3–0 forfeit.

Participating clubs

Round of 32

 [Nov 6]
 FC Uster		0-4 FC Zürich
 FC Lugano		ppd FC Turgi
 FC Lugano		4-0 FC Turgi			[Dec 11]
 FC Thun			1-2 Servette FC Genève		[aet]
 FC Sion                 1-0 FC Fribourg
 FC Luzern 		ppd FC Chiasso
 FC Luzern 		5-1 FC Chiasso			[Dec 11]
 AC Bellinzona 		ppd Young Fellows Zürich
 AC Bellinzona 		3-0 Young Fellows Zürich	[Dec 11]
 Grünstern Ipsach	1-3 Xamax-Sports
 FC Biel-Bienne		2-0 Minerva Bern
 FC Grenchen		7-1 Vevey-Sports
 Le Locle-Sports		3-0 FC Moutier
 Grasshopper Club Z	6-2 FC Wettingen
 FC La Chaux-de-Fonds	2-0 FC Aarau
 FC St.Gallen 		1-2 BSC Young Boys Bern
 Urania-Genève-Sport     0-3 Lausanne-Sports
 FC Winterthur		3-0 FC Frauenfeld

Round of 16

 [Dec 11]
 FC Grenchen		0-1 FC Biel-Bienne
 Le Locle-Sports		1-4 Grasshopper Club Zürich
 FC Winterthur		3-1 BSC Young Boys Bern
 Lausanne-Sports		2-0 FC La Chaux-de-Fonds
 [Dec 18]
 FC Lugano 		1-0 Servette FC Genève
 AC Bellinzona 		4-1 Xamax-Sports
 FC Sion                 3-0 FC Luzern 			[abd at 80']
 FC Sion is qualified [Sion - Luzern 3-0 Forfait]

Quarter-finals

 [March 5]
 Grasshopper Club	0-0 FC Lugano			[aet]
 FC Lugano		5-0 Grasshopper Club Zürich	[Replay]
 FC Sion			4-0 AC Bellinzona 
 FC Winterthur		0-3 Lausanne-Sports

Semi-finals

Final

Sources and References 
 Rotblau: Jahrbuch Saison 2014/2015. Publisher: FC Basel Marketing AG. 
 Switzerland 1966–67 at RSSSF

External links
 Official site 

Swiss Cup seasons
Swiss Cup, 1966-67
Swiss Cup